Pradeep Kumar Sinha (born 18 July 1955;; Hindi: प्रदीप कुमार सिन्हा) is a 1977 batch Indian Administrative Service (IAS) officer of the Uttar Pradesh cadre, who was the 31st Cabinet Secretary of India. Prior to this appointment he served as the Power Secretary of India, and was the Shipping Secretary of India before that.

On August 30, 2019 Sinha was appointed as Officer on Special Duty in the Prime Minister's Office. And on 11 September 2019, he was appointed as Principal Advisor to Prime Minister of India, Narendra Damodardas Modi. He resigned from the aforementioned post on 16 March 2021 citing personal reasons.

Education 
Sinha is an economics graduate, and holds a postgraduate degree in economics He holds an MPhil degree as well.

Career 
Sinha has served in various key posts in both the Government of India and the Government of Uttar Pradesh, such as Principal Secretary (Irrigation), commissioner of Varanasi division, Investment Commissioner of Uttar Pradesh, additional CEO of Greater Noida, additional resident commissioner of Uttar Pradesh, the district magistrate and collector of districts of Agra and Jaunpur, secretary of Uttaranchal Development Authority and as the vice chairman of Meerut Development Authority in the Uttar Pradesh government, and as the Cabinet Secretary of India, Union Power Secretary, Union Shipping Secretary, special secretary and financial advisor in the Ministry of Petroleum and Natural Gas, joint secretary in the Ministry of Youth Affairs and Sports in the Indian government.

Shipping Secretary 
Sinha was appointed as the Union Shipping Secretary by the prime minister-headed Appointments Committee of the Cabinet (ACC) in February 2012, he assumed office on 1 February 2012, and demitted it on 31 June 2013.

Power Secretary 
Sinha was appointed as the Union Power Secretary by the ACC in June 2013, he assumed office on 1 July 2013, and demitted it on 1 June 2015, when he was designated to become the Cabinet Secretary of India.

Cabinet Secretary 

Sinha was appointed the Cabinet Secretary of India on 29 May 2015 by the ACC. He succeeded Ajit Seth. He served as an officer of special (OSD), in the rank of secretary, in the Cabinet Secretariat till Seth's retirement, formally taking charge as Cabinet Secretary on 13 June 2015.

The union government constituted a selection committee headed by Cabinet Secretary P.K. Sinha for the shortlisting of candidates for Reserve Bank India governorship following the end of Raghuram Rajan's term in September 2016. Urjit Patel was appointed as Governor of RBI, with effect from 4 September 2016.

On 25 April 2017, Sinha got an extension of one year as Cabinet Secretary. Sinha was granted another one year extension in May 2018 by the ACC.

During his tenure as the Cabinet Secretary, Sinha, has been widely regarded as one of the most powerful people in India.

References

External links 

1955 births
Living people
People from Delhi
Cabinet Secretaries of India
Indian Administrative Service officers
St. Stephen's College, Delhi alumni
Delhi School of Economics alumni
District magistrate